The 2004 Drake Bulldogs football team represented Drake University as a member of the North Division of the Pioneer Football League (PFL) during the 2004 NCAA Division I-AA football season. Led by 12th-year head coach Rob Ash, the Bulldogs compiled an overall record of 10–2 with a mark of 4–0 in conference play, winning the PFL North Division title. Drake advanced to the PFL Championship Game, where they beat  to win the conference championship. The team played its home games at Drake Stadium in Des Moines, Iowa.

The Bulldogs were chosen as a 2004 Sports Network Cup finalist, finishing second to Monmouth in both overall votes and first place votes.

Schedule

References

Drake
Drake Bulldogs football seasons
Pioneer Football League champion seasons
Drake Bulldogs football